This is a following list for the MTV Movie Award winners for Best Shirtless Performance. The award was first given out in 2013, and was last given out in 2015.

References

MTV Movie & TV Awards
Nudity